Lambda Epsilon Chi is a national academic honor society for paralegal students. Lambda Epsilon Chi recognizes students who have demonstrated superior academic performance in an established, qualified program of paralegal/legal assistant studies offered at an institution that is an Institutional member in good standing of the American Association for Paralegal Education (AAfPE).

Membership
Candidates for membership in Lambda Epsilon Chi must be in good academic standing and have completed at least two-thirds of their paralegal coursework. Candidates also must have a minimum overall grade point average (GPA) of 3.5, including a minimum GPA of 3.75 in paralegal courses. Students must also demonstrate a commitment to the paralegal profession and exhibit ethical behavior. Most chapters require candidates to obtain faculty endorsements and to submit a personal statement.

History
Created in 1996 and sponsored by AAfPE, the society offers students national scholarship opportunities, participation in regional, state and local conferences, and networking opportunities with other legal professionals. There are approximately 150 Chapters throughout the United States with well over 2,200 inductees who have been honored for their outstanding academic achievements.

Symbolism
 The Greek letters Lambda Epsilon Chi correspond with the Latin letters lex, which means law.

See also 
 Order of the Coif (honor society, law)
 The Order of Barristers (honor society, law; litigation)
 Phi Delta Phi (honor society, law; was a professional fraternity)
 Alpha Phi Sigma (honor society, criminal justice)
 Delta Theta Phi (professional fraternity, law)
 Gamma Eta Gamma (professional fraternity, law)
 Phi Alpha Delta (professional fraternity, law)
 Phi Beta Gamma (professional fraternity, law)
 Phi Delta Delta (professional fraternity, women, law)
 Sigma Delta Kappa (professional fraternity, law)
 Kappa Alpha Pi (professional) (professional fraternity, pre-law)
 Kappa Beta Pi (originally women's professional fraternity, now legal association, law)
 Nu Beta Epsilon (Jewish, originally men's professional fraternity, law, dormant?)

References

Organizations established in 1999
Honor societies
1999 establishments in the United States